
Schwarzsee is a mountain lake in the canton of Valais, Switzerland. It is located at an elevation of 2611 m, below Bella Tola (3025 m) and Brunnethorn (2952 m), above the Turtmanntal. It is part of the municipality of Oberems.

Lakes of Valais